= Daley Creek =

Stream in Oregon, U.S.

Coordinates: 42°18′33″N 122°21′59″W

Daley Creek is a stream in the U.S. state of Oregon. It is a tributary to Beaver Dam Creek.

Daley Creek was named after one William Carter Daley.
